The "Patriotic Hymn of the Great Korean Empire" was the national anthem of the Korean Empire during the 1900s. It was the first and only national anthem of a unified Korean state to date.

History
The national anthem was first commissioned by Emperor Gojong in 1901 and presented to the Korean court on 1 July 1902, by German composer Franz Eckert, who was the director of the Korean Empire's military band at the time. It was published in Germany in five different languages (Korean, German, English, Chinese, and French) and performed for the first time on 9 September 1902, during Emperor Gojong's birthday ceremony.

The imminent demise of the Korean Empire's independence, however, meant that the state anthem did not become widely promulgated or available. With the signing of the Eulsa Treaty in 1905, the Korean Empire was made into a colony of the Empire of Japan and in 1910 was annexed outright by Japan with "Kimigayo" replacing the Korean national anthem.

Lyrics (monarchist version) 

It was the original version made for Emperor Gojong.

Lyrics (republican version)
The republican lyrics were re-discovered on 13 August 2004, by curator Lee Dong-guk of the Seoul Calligraphy Art Museum.

The discovery came as a surprise even in South Korea, where the existence of the republican lyrics was unknown until then. The finding was later reported in the mass media and has since then been performed by various K-pop artists. Hawaii has been a source for various pre-Japanese annexation heritage investigations by South Korea since many Korean Empire citizens emigrated to Hawaii before the Japanese annexation. One recent incident involved a Korean Empire émigré descendant donating a very rare 100-plus-year-old original passport issued by the Korean Empire to South Korean president Roh Moo-hyun during his visit to Hawaii.

The republican lyrics are:

While the copy appearing in the source appears markedly newer than the 1900s and calls it the "Korean national anthem" instead of "Patriotic song of the Korean Empire" as one would expect from a 1900s original, it clearly shows pre-1933 orthography (reproduced here) that was not used after the 1940s.

See also

"Aegukga", the national anthem of South Korea
"Aegukka", the national anthem of North Korea

References

Korean Empire
Aegukga
National symbols of Korea
Historical national anthems
Royal anthems